Sar Asiab (also Romanized as Sar Āsīāb; also known as Āseyāābād, Āsīāābād, and Sar Āsīāb-e Mījān) is a village in Rezvan Rural District, Jebalbarez District, Jiroft County, Kerman Province, Iran. At the 2006 census, its population was 95, in 26 families.

References 

Populated places in Jiroft County